Willie Anthony Banks (born February 27, 1969) is a former pitcher in Major League Baseball who played for the Minnesota Twins, Chicago Cubs, Los Angeles Dodgers, Florida Marlins, New York Yankees, Arizona Diamondbacks and Boston Red Sox.

At St. Anthony's High School, he twice struck out 19 batters in a seven inning game.

Banks was a member of the 1991 World Series champion Minnesota Twins and the 1995 National League Western Division champion Los Angeles Dodgers.

Banks missed the entire 1996 season following shoulder surgery necessitated by a nerve condition.

In nine seasons he had a 33–39 record over 181 games, with 84 games started, 1 complete game, 1 shutout, 40 games finished, 2 saves,  innings pitched, 632 hits allowed, 370 runs allowed, 322 earned runs allowed, 65 home runs allowed, 302 walks allowed, 428 strikeouts, 15 hit batsmen, 41 wild pitches, 2,717 batters faced, 16 intentional walks, 10 balks and a 4.75 ERA.

References

External links
, or Nippon Professional Baseball, or Retrosheet, or The Baseball Gauge, or Venezuelan Professional Baseball League

1969 births
Living people
African-American baseball players
American expatriate baseball players in Japan
Arizona Diamondbacks players
Baseball players from Jersey City, New Jersey
Boston Red Sox players
Cardenales de Lara players
Caribes de Oriente players
Chicago Cubs players
Columbus Clippers players
Elizabethton Twins players
Florida Marlins players
Iowa Cubs players
Kenosha Twins players
Leones del Caracas players
American expatriate baseball players in Venezuela
Los Angeles Dodgers players
Major League Baseball pitchers
Minnesota Twins players
New York Yankees players
Newark Bears players
Norfolk Tides players
Orix BlueWave players
Orlando Sun Rays players
Orlando Twins players
Pawtucket Red Sox players
Portland Beavers players
Sportspeople from Manhattan
Baseball players from New York City
Syracuse SkyChiefs players
Tigres de Aragua players
Visalia Oaks players
21st-century African-American people
20th-century African-American sportspeople
St. Anthony High School (New Jersey) alumni